Tales of the Jazz Age (1922) is a collection of eleven short stories by F. Scott Fitzgerald. Divided into three separate parts, according to subject matter, it includes one of his better-known short stories, "The Curious Case of Benjamin Button". All of the stories had been published earlier, independently, in either Metropolitan Magazine, The Saturday Evening Post, Smart Set, Collier's, the Chicago Sunday Tribune, or Vanity Fair.

My Last Flappers

"The Jelly-Bean" 
"The Jelly-Bean" is a story set in the southern United States, in the city of Tarleton, Georgia. Fitzgerald wrote that he had "a profound affection for Tarleton, but somehow whenever I write a story about it I receive letters from all over the South denouncing me in no uncertain terms." Written shortly after his first novel was published, the author also collaborated with his wife on certain scenes.

The story momentarily follows the life of a "jelly-bean", or idler, named Jim Powell. An invitation to a dance with the old crowd revives his dreams of social advancement and love, until the consequences of drink and power of money come through and ruin them.

"The Camel's Back" 
In the short introduction to this short story, Fitzgerald wrote, "I suppose that of all the stories I have ever written this one cost me the least travail and perhaps gave me the most amusement." The story, he confessed, was written "with the express purpose of buying a platinum and diamond wrist watch which cost six hundred dollars", and took seven hours to finish. Though it was the least-liked story by Fitzgerald in the volume, it was included in the O. Henry Memorial Collection (of the O. Henry Award) of 1920.

Fitzgerald claimed the story was based on actual incident that occurred in St. Paul, Minnesota, in 1919. "Three friends called up during the evening to tell me I had missed some rare doings," Fitzgerald later recalled, "a well-known man-about-town had disguised himself as a camel and, with a taxi-driver as the rear half, managed to attend the wrong party. Aghast with myself for not being there, I spent the next day trying to collect the fragments of the story."

"May Day"  
Published as a novelette in The Smart Set in July, 1920, "May Day" relates a series of events which took place in the spring of the previous year, during the "general hysteria" which inaugurated the Jazz Age.

"Porcelain and Pink" 

A play, published in The Smart Set in January, 1920.

Fantasias 
The following short stories were written in what Fitzgerald called his "second manner". They were designed for the author's own amusement, as he states in his introduction to the volume.

 "The Diamond as Big as the Ritz"
 "The Curious Case of Benjamin Button"

In Fitzgerald's introduction, he describes the circumstances in which he wrote "The Curious Case of Benjamin Button" :
This story was inspired by a remark of Mark Twain's to the effect that
it was a pity that the best part of life came at the beginning and the
worst part at the end. By trying the experiment upon only one man in a
perfectly normal world I have scarcely given his idea a fair trial.
Several weeks after completing it, I discovered an almost identical
plot in Samuel Butler's "Note-books."

The story was published in "Collier's" last summer and provoked this
startling letter from an anonymous admirer in Cincinnati:

"Sir--

I have read the story Benjamin Button in Collier's and I wish to say
that as a short story writer you would make a good lunatic I have seen
many pieces of cheese in my life but of all the pieces of cheese I
have ever seen you are the biggest piece. I hate to waste a piece of
stationery on you but I will."
 "Tarquin of Cheapside"

Written almost six years before being added to this collection, this story was written in Fitzgerald's undergraduate days at Princeton. Considerably revised, it was published in the
"Smart Set" in 1921.

 "Oh Russet Witch!"

This story was written just after the author completed the first draft of his second novel. However it may seem, the story was supposed to be in the present time/tense. It was published in the Metropolitan.

Unclassified Masterpieces 
 "The Lees of Happiness"
 "Mr. Icky"
 "Jemina"

Written, like "Tarquin of Cheapside",  at Princeton, this sketch was published years later in Vanity Fair.

References

Citations

Works cited

External links 

Tales of the Jazz Age at Project Gutenberg
Tales of the Jazz Age at Internet Archive
 

1922 short story collections
Short story collections by F. Scott Fitzgerald
Charles Scribner's Sons books